The Mercosur Parliament, known also as Parlasur, or Parlasul, is the parliamentary institution of the Mercosur trade bloc. It is composed of 81 MPs, 18 from each member states of the bloc – Argentina, Brazil, Paraguay and Uruguay – and 9 from applying member Venezuela. Associate members – Bolivia, Chile, Colombia, Ecuador and Peru – may also hold seats in the Parliament, but with no voting powers.

History
The creation of the Mercosur Parliament traces back to a 2002 process of establishing bodies and procedures aimed at the institutionalization and political autonomy of the bloc.

During the XXVII Meeting of Mercosur Heads of State on 17 December 2004, at Ouro Preto, Minas Gerais, the Common Market Council (CMC) instructed the Joint Parliamentary Commission (CPC) to write a protocol establishing the Mercosur Parliament, recommending its completion until the end of 2006. The CPC created the project in advance and on 9 December 2005, the presidents of Argentina, Brazil, Paraguay and Uruguay signed the Constitutive Protocol of the Mercosur Parliament, creating the new body.

The first session of the Parliament should have been held before 31 December 2006, but it was only held on 7 May 2007, replacing the CPC. In June 2008, the MPs held their first parliamentary session outside the Mercosur headquarters in Montevideo, on the city of San Miguel de Tucumán, where the XXXV Meeting of Mercosur Heads of State was also being held.

Members

The representatives of the 1st Mercosur Parliament were chosen among nominated members of the national parliaments from the bloc. Their mandates expired on 31 December 2010.

Starting with the 2008 Paraguayan general elections, members of the Parliament were directly elected. It was expected that Brazilians would be the next to elect their representatives through direct vote, during the Brazilian 2010 general elections, and Argentines, in the Argentine 2011 general elections, but both elections were not held. The first simultaneous election was expected to occur in 2015. Adriana Pichardo is the incumbent deputy of the Parliament.

Now, the deadline for every Mercosur member to hold direct elections was delayed to 2020.

See also 
Latin American Parliament
South American Parliament (proposed)
Bank of the South
Central American Parliament
United Nations Parliamentary Assembly

References 

Protocolo Constitutivo del Parlamento del Mercosur (2005)

External links

Parlasur
Parlasur
Buildings and structures in Montevideo
Parque Rodó, Montevideo
Supranational legislatures
2007 establishments in Uruguay